The following is a list of tram/streetcar (including heritage trams/heritage streetcars), or light rail systems with their track length, track gauge,  electrification system.

The vast majority of tram systems use . Generally, standard gauge is the standard for every brand new system (except for the former Soviet Union), even in places where there is another gauge for the heavy rail. Metre gauge is mainly present in some old, continuously operating systems in Central Europe. Russian gauge is used only in the former Soviet Union. While in Central Europe the standard gauge and metre gauge coexist, in the former Soviet Union only the Russian gauge is used.

The electrification system for the old systems is generally 600 V DC while the more recent systems use 750 V DC. Some old systems upgraded to 750 V in recent year (mostly in Germany) while some systems (in Romania) downgraded the voltage to 600 V to use the second hand vehicles coming from the upgraded German networks. Few systems are partially or wholly catenary-free, with APS and ACR systems or using a pure internal power source as battery or ultracapacitors. Very few vintage systems are horse-drawn tram or cable car.
For references for the figures, see each system's page.


Systems in operation 
Note: Overhead line electrification unless specified differently

Track gauge of defunct systems

Narrow gauge

Standard gauge

Broad gauge

See also 

 Battery electric multiple unit
 Comparison of train and tram tracks
 List of tram and light rail transit systems
 List of track gauges
 Narrow gauges used
 Track gauge
 Rapid transit track gauge
 Tramway track
 Railway electrification system
 List of railway electrification systems
 Ground-level power supply
 Acumulador de Carga Rápida
 Traction current pylon

References

External links 
 

Track gauges
Tram track gauges
Tram electric traction
Trams
Electric rail transport